Ectoedemia vivesi is a moth of the family Nepticulidae. It is only known from Spain (Andalusia) and Cyprus.

The wingspan is 6-6.2 mm. Adults are on wing from late June to early July.

The host plant is unknown.

External links
Fauna Europaea
Western Palaearctic Ectoedemia (Zimmermannia) Hering and Ectoedemia Busck s. str. (Lepidoptera, Nepticulidae): five new species and new data on distribution, hostplants and recognition

Nepticulidae
Moths of Europe
Moths described in 2009